Rogelio Chirino (born December 23, 1946) is a Cuban sprint canoer who competed in the early 1970s. He was eliminated in the repechages of the K-2 1000 m event at the 1972 Summer Olympics in Munich.

References
Sports-reference.com profile

1946 births
Canoeists at the 1972 Summer Olympics
Cuban male canoeists
Living people
Olympic canoeists of Cuba
Place of birth missing (living people)
20th-century Cuban people